Allegheny Islands State Park is a  Pennsylvania state park in Harmar Township, Allegheny County, Pennsylvania in the United States. The undeveloped park is composed of three alluvial islands located in the middle of the Allegheny River northeast of Pittsburgh. The islands are just north of the boroughs of Oakmont and Plum, and southwest of Cheswick. Bridges for the Pennsylvania Turnpike (Interstate 76) and the Bessemer and Lake Erie Railroad Branch of the Canadian National Railway cross the Allegheny River at the  middle island.

Islands
Twelve Mile Island is the farthest downstream (west) and has a number of houses and buildings on the western four-fifths of the island (the park land is the eastern end). The remaining two islands are both uninhabited and have no structures on them. They were originally one island named Fourteen Mile Island, but were split into two parts by the construction of the dam. Today the name Fourteen Mile Island is given to the middle island, just downstream (west) of the dam, and it is the site of the highway and railroad bridges. According to the USGS GNIS, the last island (which was once part of Fourteen Mile Island) is unnamed (although it is still labeled "Fourteen Mile Island" on the U.S. Army Corps of Engineers navigation maps of the Allegheny River.) This unnamed island is the easternmost and the only one upstream of the dam. There are also five to seven shoals near the islands, which are occasionally exposed.

They are two of six alluvial islands in the Allegheny River near Pittsburgh (for comparison, near Pittsburgh the Ohio River has only three islands and the Monongahela River has none). "The large number of islands in the Allegheny is a reflection of the large amount of glacially-derived sediment that was moved by the river."

Facilities

Allegheny Islands State Park  was established on December 31, 1980. , it is undeveloped so that there are no facilities, and also no plans for future development. The park can only be accessed by boat. Camping is allowed on the islands and they are open for visits by groups such as the Boy Scouts and Venture Outdoors. Allegheny Islands State Park is administered from the Region 2 Office in Prospect, Pennsylvania.

Nearby state parks
The following state parks are within  of Allegheny Islands State Park:
Hillman State Park (Washington County)

Keystone State Park (Westmoreland County)

Point State Park (Allegheny County)

References

External links

Allegheny Islands
Parks in the Pittsburgh metropolitan area
Islands of the Allegheny River in Pennsylvania
Protected areas established in 1980
Parks in Allegheny County, Pennsylvania
Islands of Allegheny County, Pennsylvania
1980 establishments in Pennsylvania
Protected areas of Allegheny County, Pennsylvania